The Pennsylvania Department of General Services (DGS) is an agency of the U.S. state of Pennsylvania that supports the core operations of Pennsylvania state government. 

DGS builds all non-highway Capital projects, procures nearly $4 billion of goods and services, serves as the real estate agent for state-owned land and leases, oversees the Commonwealth vehicle fleet, maintains all state-owned facilities, implements an energy-management and conservation initiative in all state-owned buildings, serves as the state’s insurance broker, monitors participation in state contracts by small and small diverse businesses, manages federal and state surplus and supplies, and oversees the Capitol Police, Commonwealth Media Services, and the Bureau of Publications. 

DGS was created by Act 45 of 1975. This legislation combined the duties of the Department of Property and Supplies and the General State Authority (GSA) to form the Department of General Services.

Organizational structure 
The DGS is divided into the following sub-units:

 Deputy Secretary of Administration
 Bureau of Finance and Risk Management
 Bureau of Human Resources
 Commonwealth Media Services
 Bureau of Publications
Deputy Secretary for Diversity, Inclusion and Small Business Opportunities
Bureau of Diversity, Inclusion and Small Business Opportunities
 Deputy Secretary for Procurement
 Bureau of Procurement
 Bureau of Vehicle Management
 Bureau of Supplies and Surplus Operations
 Commonwealth Agency Recycling Office
 Office of Enterprise Wireless Management
 Deputy Secretary for Property and Asset Management
 Bureau of Police and Safety
 Bureau of Facilities Management
 Energy and Resource Management Office
 GreenGov Council
 Special Events Office
 Deputy Secretary for Public Works
 Bureau of Capital Projects Construction
 Bureau of Capital Projects Planning and Procurement
 Bureau of Capital Project Design
 Office of Workplace Operations 
 Office of Chief Counsel

See also 
 List of Pennsylvania state agencies

Notes

References 

Government agencies established in 1975
1975 establishments in Pennsylvania
General Services